Streptomyces phyllanthi is a bacterium species from the genus of Streptomyces which has been isolated from the stem of the tree Phyllanthus amarus.

See also 
 List of Streptomyces species

References

External links
Type strain of Streptomyces phyllanthi at BacDive -  the Bacterial Diversity Metadatabase

 

phyllanthi
Bacteria described in 2016